Łukasz Rogulski (born 10 June 1993) is a Polish professional handball player who plays for AEK Athens and the Polish national team.

References

1993 births
Living people
Sportspeople from Olsztyn
Polish male handball players